Vladimir Nikolaevich Shokorov (1868–1940) was a Russian soldier active in the First World War and the Russian Civil War.

On 26 September 1917 General Nikolay Dukhonin appointed him commander of the Czechoslovak corps.

References

1868 births
1940 deaths
Russian generals
Russian military personnel of World War I
People of the Russian Civil War